This article is about music-related events in 1836.

Events 
June 7 – Huddersfield Choral Society formed in the north of England.
July – Soprano Maria Malibran is seriously injured in a riding accident, but refuses to see a doctor; she dies later in the year at the age of 28.
September 9 – Frédéric Chopin proposes marriage to Maria Wodzinski in Marienbad.
November 24 – Richard Wagner marries Minna Planer.
Saverio Mercadante is invited to Paris by Gioacchino Rossini.

Classical music 
William Sterndale Bennett – Overture to The Naiads
Henri Bertini – 2 Nocturnes, Op.102
Ernesto Cavallini – 3 Duos for 2 Clarinets
Gaetano Donizetti 
String Quartet No.18, A 482
Viva il matrimonio (Se tu giri tutto il mondo)
Louise Farrenc – Air russe varie, Op. 17
Auguste Franchomme – Chant d’Adieux
Franz Paul Lachner – Symphony No.5, Op.52
Fanny Mendelssohn – Frühzeitiger Frühling
Felix Mendelssohn – St. Paul
Robert Schumann – Fantasie in C
Henri Vieuxtemps – Violin Concerto No. 2 in F♯ minor
Issac Nathan  – "Queen of Evening"

Opera 
Adolphe Adam – Le Postillon de Longjumeau
Louise Bertin – La Esmeralda (with libretto by Victor Hugo), premiered November 14 in Paris 
Gaetano Donizetti 
L'assedio di Calais, premiered November 18 in Naples
Belisario
Il campanello, premiered June 1 in Naples
Mikhail Glinka – A Life for the Tsar
Saverio Mercadante – I Briganti, premiered March 22 in Paris
Giacomo Meyerbeer – Les Huguenots
Richard Wagner – Das Liebesverbot

Popular music
"Fair Harvard" (lyrics by Samuel Gilman)
"Morning Star" (music by Francis F. Hagen)

Publications
John Addison – Singing Practically Treated in a Series of Instructions
Dionisio Aguado – La Guitare, méthode simple
Adolphe Miné – Méthode d'orgue

Births 
February 16 – Benjamin Edward Woolf, violinist (died 1901)
February 21 – Léo Delibes, composer (d. 1891)
February 22 – Mitrofan Belyayev, music publisher (d. 1904)
March 21 – Bertha Tammelin, Swedish musician, composer and singer (died 1915)
March 24 – Eufrosyne Abrahamson, Swedish soprano (d. 1869)
April 8 – Henry Brougham Farnie, librettist (died 1889)
June 12 – Bernardine Hamaekers, Belgian opera singer (died 1912)
June 29 – Thomas Philander Ryder, composer, organist, teacher, conductor, and organ builder (d. 1887)
October 27 – Luigi Hugues, geographer, flautist and composer (d. 1913)
October 28 – Eliakum Zunser, Yiddish songwriter (d. 1925)
November 18 – W. S. Gilbert, dramatist, poet and librettist (d. 1911)
November 23 – Wilhelm Barge, flautist (died 1925)
December 2 – Giuseppe Donati, inventor of the ocarina (d. 1925)
date unknown 
Tamburi Ali Efendi, Turkish tanbur virtuoso and composer (d. 1902)
Marie Proksch, pianist (died 1900)

Deaths 
January 3 – Friedrich Witt, cellist and composer (b. 1770)
February 8 – Franziska Stading, opera singer (b. 1763)
February 22 – John Clarke Whitfield, organist and composer (b. 1770)
May 7 – Norbert Burgmüller, composer (b. 1810) (drowned)
May 28 – Anton Reicha, composer (b. 1770)
June 9 – Supply Belcher, composer, singer, and compiler of tune books (b. 1751)
June 26 – Claude Joseph Rouget de Lisle, composer of "La Marseillaise" (b. 1760)
September 19 – Carl Friedrich Ebers, composer (born 1770)
September 21 – John Stafford Smith, British composer, organist and musicologist (b. 1750)
September 23
Maria Malibran, operatic soprano (b. 1808)
Andreas Razumovsky, patron of Ludwig van Beethoven (b. 1752)
December 5 – Giuseppe Ciccimarra, operatic tenor (b. 1790)
December 12 – Giuseppe Farinelli, composer (born 1769)
December 26 – Hans Georg Nägeli, composer and music publisher (b. 1773)
December 29 – Johann Baptist Schenk, Austrian composer and teacher (b. 1753)

References 

 
19th century in music
Music by year